C36 is a secondary route in Namibia that runs from the B2 at Wilhelmstal. It is intersected by the C33 at Omaruru before terminating at Uis, where it joins the C35. The C36 is paved.

References 

Roads in Namibia